The  Montgomery County Chronicle  is a local weekly newspaper published each Wednesday for the cities of Caney, Cherryvale, Coffeyville and Independence, Kansas.  It is a member of the Kansas Press Association and was formerly published as the Cherryvale Chronicle and as the Caney Chronicle. The Caney Chronicle was established in 1885. The newspaper also maintains an online presence.

References

Newspapers published in Kansas
Montgomery County, Kansas
Publications established in 1885